Boroldoy is a village in the Kemin District, Chüy Region, Kyrgyzstan. Its population was 2,181 in 2021. It is the center of Boroldoy rural community (ayyl aymagy).

References

Populated places in Chüy Region